The history of political thought encompasses the chronology and the substantive and methodological changes of human political thought. The study of the history of political thought represents an intersection of various academic disciplines, such as philosophy, law, history and political science.

Many histories of Western political thought trace its origins to ancient Greece (specifically to Athenian democracy and Ancient Greek philosophy). The political philosophy of thinkers such as Socrates, Plato, and Aristotle are traditionally elevated as exceptionally important and influential in such works.

Non-Western traditions and histories of political thought have, by comparison, often been underrepresented in academic research. Such non-Western traditions of political thought have been identified, among others, in ancient China (specifically in the form of early Chinese philosophy), and in ancient India (where the Arthashastra represents an early treatise on governance and politics). Another notable non-Western school of political thought emerged in the 7th century, when the spread of Islam rapidly expanded the outreach of Islamic political philosophy.

The study of the history of political thought has inspired academic journals, and has been furthered by university programs.

Ancient political thought

China 
From around 770 BCE, China began to experience a time of peace and prosperity, which allowed the rise of the so-called Hundred Schools of Thought, the most influential of which was that of Confucius. His thinking was firmly based in traditional Chinese worldview, which saw the values of loyalty, duty, and respect as paramount. He believed that people and society can be improved by reciprocal treatment through moral example set by a leader embodying these virtues, as society would then respond to such good leaders by emulating them. He encapsulated this by saying that:

For this to work, however, society had to be ordered hierarchically, modeled after the patriarchal family. and headed by an absolute sovereign. However, Confucius also believed the state should employ a meritocratic class of administrators and advisers, recruited by civil service exams. Among later Chinese thinkers, Mozi agreed with his ideas of meritocracy and leading by example, but opposed the family-model of governance with the belief that it would be nepotistic. Mencius, however, championed his ideas later on. An alternative Chinese philosophy called Legalism argued that instead of virtue, authoritarian discipline was crucial for the governance of the state.

Greece 
The origins of European political thought are in ancient Rome and Greece. Starting in approximately 600 BCE, thinkers in these societies began to consider questions of how to organize societies, as part of their more broad considerations of ethics and how to live the good life. 

In the intellectual golden age of the  fifth-century Athenian democracy, Plato had the freedom to develop his ideas, although he nevertheless despised democracy, alongside all other then existing form of government. This was because Plato believed that the state should promote the virtues necessary for good living, but thought the existing political arrangements of monarchy, oligarchy, and democracy all promoted the interests of the people in power, who were ignorant of those virtues, and instead would only pursue honour and wealth, leading to conflict and injustice. To correct this, Plato proposed in the Republic for philosopher kings, who would know how to achieve the good life, to be in power instead.

India 
In India, Chanakya (c. 4th century BCE) offered in Arthashastra practical advice on how to run government. He also believed that virtue in the leader and the merit of their advisers were important. Furthermore, he also argued that the end justifies the means, and that after using the best means available to defeat their enemies, rulers should "substitute [their] virtues for the defeated enemy's vices, and where the enemy was good [they] shall be twice as good". Prior to him, Manu wrote about similar topics in his Manusmriti.

Post-classical political thought

Europe
The early-Christian philosophy of Augustine of Hippo was by and large a rewrite of Plato in a Christian context. The main change that Christianity wrought was to moderate the Stoicism and theory of justice of the Roman world, and emphasize the role of the state in applying mercy as a moral example. Augustine also preached that one was not a member of his or her city, but was either a citizen of the City of God (Civitas Dei) or the City of Man (Civitas Terrena). Augustine's City of God is an influential work of this period that refuted the thesis, after the First Sack of Rome, that the Christian view could be realized on Earth at all – a view many Christian Romans held.

In the Medieval period, political philosophy in Europe was heavily influenced by Christian thinking. It had much in common with Islamic attitudes in that the Western church similarly subordinated philosophy to theology. Perhaps the most influential political philosopher of medieval Europe was St Thomas Aquinas, who helped reintroduce Aristotle's works, which, with the exception of the Politics, which was translated directly from Greek to Latin by William of Moerbeke, had only been preserved by Muslim scholars, along with the commentaries of Averroes. Aquinas's use of them set the agenda for scholastic political philosophy, which dominated European thought for centuries.

In 1215, the Magna Carta introduced the concept of constitutional rights, such as habeas corpus.

Islamic World

The rise of Islam, based on both the Qur'an and Muhammad, strongly altered the power balances and perceptions of origin of power in the Mediterranean region. Early Islamic philosophy emphasized an inexorable link between science and religion, and the process of ijtihad to find truth - in effect all philosophy was "political" as it had real implications for governance. This view was challenged by the Mutazilite philosophers, who held a more Greek view and were supported by secular aristocracy who sought freedom of action independent of the Caliphate. By the late medieval period, however, the Asharite view of Islam had in general triumphed.

Islamic political philosophy, was, indeed, rooted in the very sources of Islam, i.e. the Qur'an and the Sunnah, the words and practices of Muhammad. However, in the Western thought, it is generally supposed that it was a specific area peculiar merely to the great philosophers of Islam: al-Kindi (Alkindus), al-Farabi (Abunaser), İbn Sina (Avicenna), Ibn Bajjah (Avempace), Ibn Rushd (Averroes), and Ibn Khaldun. The political conceptions of Islam such as kudrah, sultan, ummah, simaa -and even the "core" terms of the Qur'an, i.e. ibada, din, rab and ilah- is taken as the basis of an analysis. Hence, not only the ideas of the Muslim political philosophers but also many other jurists and ulama posed political ideas and theories. For example, the ideas of the Khawarij in the very early years of Islamic history on Khilafa and Ummah, or that of Shia Islam on the concept of Imamah are considered proofs of political thought. The clashes between the Ehl-i Sunna and Shia in the 7th and 8th centuries had a genuine political character.

The 14th century Arab scholar Ibn Khaldun is considered one of the greatest political theorists. The British philosopher-anthropologist Ernest Gellner considered Ibn Khaldun's definition of government, "an institution which prevents injustice other than such as it commits itself", the best in the history of political theory.

Modern political thought

Renaissance 
During the Renaissance secular political philosophy began to emerge after about a century of theological political thought in Europe. One of the most influential works during this burgeoning period was Niccolò Machiavelli's The Prince, written between 1511–12 and published in 1532, after Machiavelli's death. That work, as well as The Discourses, a rigorous analysis of the classical period, did much to influence modern political thought in the West. A minority (including Jean-Jacques Rousseau) would interpret The Prince as satire meant to imply the Medici after their recapture of Florence and their subsequent expulsion of Machiavelli from Florence. Though the work was written for the Medici family in order to perhaps influence them to free him from exile, Machiavelli supported the Republic of Florence rather than the oligarchy of the Medici family. At any rate, Machiavelli presents a pragmatic and somewhat consequentialist view of politics, whereby good and evil are mere means used to bring about an end, i.e. the maintenance of political authority. Thomas Hobbes, well known for his theory of the social contract, goes on to expand this view at the start of the 17th century during the English Renaissance.

John Locke in particular exemplified this new age of political theory with his work Two Treatises of Government. In it Locke proposes a state-of-nature theory that directly complements his conception of how political development occurs and how it can be founded through contractual obligation. Locke stood to refute Sir Robert Filmer's paternally founded political theory in favor of a natural system based on nature in a particular given system.

Age of Enlightenment 
During the Enlightenment period, new theories about what the human was and is and about the definition of reality and the way it was perceived, along with the discovery of other societies in the Americas, and the changing needs of political societies (especially in the wake of the English Civil War, the American Revolution and the French Revolution) led to new questions and insights by such thinkers as Jean-Jacques Rousseau, Montesquieu and John Locke.

These theorists were driven by two basic questions: one, by what right or need do people form states; and two, what is the best form a state can take.  These fundamental questions involved a distinction between the concepts of ‘state’ and ‘government’.  It was decided that ‘state’ would refer to a set of enduring institutions through which power would be distributed and its use justified. The term ‘government’ would refer to a specific group of people who occupied the state at any given time, and created the laws and ordinances by which the people, the government included, would be bound. This conceptual distinction continues to operate in political science, although some political scientists, philosophers, historians and cultural anthropologists have argued that most political action in any given society occurs outside of its state, and that there are societies that are not organized into states which nevertheless must be considered in political terms.

Political and economic relations were drastically influenced by these theories as the concept of the guild was subordinated to the theory of free trade, and Roman Catholic dominance of theology was increasingly challenged by Protestant churches subordinate to each nation-state, which also (in a fashion the Roman Catholic Church often decried angrily) preached in the vulgar or native language of each region. These ideas did not spread to cultures outside of Europe until considerably later.

Industrialization 
The Industrial Revolution changed societies dramatically. As a consequence, Karl Marx and Friedrich Engels became the first theorists of Socialism and Communism. Their ideas were further developed by Vladimir Lenin, leading to the ideology of Leninism. Under Joseph Stalin these ideas would be further developed into Marxism-Leninism and put into practice in the Soviet Union and later the Eastern Bloc. During the Cold War, this line of thought would further result in Maoism, Ho Chi Minh Thought, Hoxhaism and Titoism.

As industrialisation enabled the rise of colonialism, this was accompanied by the ideology of Imperialism. Later, anti-imperialist ideologies would counter this, such as Gandhism and Nasserism.

See also
Divine right of kings
History of economic thought
History of feminism
History of political science
Intellectual history

References

Further reading
 Fiala, Andrew, ed. The Bloomsbury Companion to Political Philosophy (2015)
 Klosko, George, ed. Oxford Handbook of the History of Political Philosophy (2012)
 Korab-Karpowicz, W. Julian. On the History of Political Philosophy: Great Political Thinkers from Thucydides to Locke (Routledge, 2015)
 Matravers, Derek, Jonathan Pike, and Nigel Warburton, eds. Reading political philosophy: Machiavelli to Mill (2000) essays by experts
 Ryan, Alan. On Politics, a new history of political philosophy (2 vols., 2012), 1152 pp, Herodotus to the present
 Skinner, Quentin. The Foundations of Modern Political Thought (2 vols., 1978) 
 Strauss, Leo, and Joseph Cropsey, eds. History of political philosophy (University of Chicago Press, 2012 reprint)

External links

  History of Political Thought Poster with visual overview.

 
Political thought